Charlotte Cove is a rural locality in the local government area (LGA) of Huon Valley in the South-east LGA region of Tasmania. The 2016 census recorded a population of 34 for the state suburb of Charlotte Cove.

History 
Charlotte Cove is a confirmed locality.

Geography
The western and southern boundaries follow the shoreline of the Huon River estuary.

Road infrastructure 
Route B68 (Channel Highway) runs through from north-west to south-east.

References

Towns in Tasmania
Localities of Huon Valley Council